Takasago Municipal Baseball Stadium (高砂市野球場) is a baseball stadium in Takasago, Hyōgo, Japan. The stadium was built in 1972 and has a capacity of 20,000, with 3,230 seats.

References

Baseball venues in Japan
Sports venues in Hyōgo Prefecture
Takasago, Hyōgo
Sports venues completed in 1972
1972 establishments in Japan